The 2022 Florida House of Representatives elections took place on November 8, 2022, as part of the 2022 United States elections. Florida voters elected state representatives in all 120 of the state's house districts. The 120 State Representatives serve four-year terms in the Florida House of Representatives. A primary election on August 23, 2022, determined which candidates appeared on the November 8 general election ballot.

Following the 2020 state House of Representatives elections, Republicans maintained effective control of the House with a majority of 78 members. Democrats hold 42 seats following the 2020 elections. Republicans expanded their House majority to 85, up from 78 in the last election, giving them a supermajority in the House.  The concurrently held Senate elections also resulted in a supermajority, giving Republicans supermajority control of the legislature.

Overview

Closest races 
Seats where the margin of victory was under 10%:
 
 
 
  gain
  gain
  gain

Predictions

Results

† - Incumbent not seeking re-election

Overview

Special elections

District 88 
Omari Hardy (incumbent) resigned to run for Congress in Florida's 20th District's special election.

General Election

District 94 
Bobby DuBose (incumbent) resigned to run for Congress in Florida's 20th District's special election.

Detailed results

District 1 
1st term incumbent Republican Representative Michelle Salzman has represented Florida House of Representatives 1st District since November 2020.

District 2 
2nd term incumbent Republican Representative Alex Andrade has represented Florida House of Representatives 2nd District since November 2018.

District 3 
3rd term incumbent Republican Representative Jayer Williamson has represented Florida House of Representatives 3rd District since November 2016.

District 4 
1st term incumbent Republican Representative Patt Maney has represented Florida House of Representatives 4th District since November 2020. The general election was not held because Maney ran unopposed.

District 5 
4th term incumbent Republican Representative Brad Drake has represented Florida House of Representatives 5th District since November 2020. Shane Abbott won the Republican primary and ran unopposed in the general election.

Republican primary

Polling

General election

District 6 
4th term incumbent Republican Representative Jay Trumbull has represented Florida House of Representatives 6th District since November 2014. Griff Griffits won the Republican nomination and ran unopposed in the general election.

District 7 
2nd term incumbent Republican Representative Jason Shoaf has represented Florida House of Representatives 7th District since November 2018. Shoaf ran unopposed in the Republican primary and the general election.

District 8 
3rd term incumbent Democratic Representative Ramon Alexander has represented Florida House of Representatives 8th District since November 2016.

District 9 
1st term incumbent Democratic Representative Allison Tant has represented Florida House of Representatives 9th District since November 2020. Tant ran uncontested in the Democratic primary and the general election.

District 10 
2nd term incumbent Republican Representative Chuck Brannan has represented Florida House of Representatives 10th District since November 2018. Brannan ran uncontested in the Republican primary and the general election.

District 11 
3rd term incumbent Republican Representative Sam Garrison has represented Florida House of Representatives 11th District since November 2016.

District 12 
3rd term incumbent Republican Representative Clay Yarborough has represented Florida House of Representatives 12th District since November 2016. Duggan ran unopposed in the Republican primary and the general election.

District 13 
3rd term incumbent Democratic Representative Tracie Davis has represented Florida House of Representatives 13th District since November 2016.

District 14 
1st term incumbent Democratic Representative Angie Nixon has represented Florida House of Representatives 15th District since November 2020.

District 15 
2nd term incumbent Republican Representative Wyman Duggan has represented Florida House of Representatives 15th District since November 2018.
Dean Black is running for election.

District 16 
3rd term incumbent Republican Representative Jason Fischer has represented Florida House of Representatives 16th District since November 2016.

District 17 
4th term incumbent Republican Representative Cyndi Stevenson has represented Florida House of Representatives 16th District since 2015.

District 18 
1st term incumbent Republican Representative Sam Garrison has represented Florida House of Representatives 18th District since November 2020. Cyndi Stevenson ran unopposed in the Republican primary and the general election.

District 19 
3rd term incumbent Republican Representative Bobby Payne has represented Florida House of Representatives 19th District since November 2016.

District 20

District 21

District 22 
1st term incumbent Republican Representative Joe Harding has represented Florida House of Representatives 22nd District since November 2020.

Democratic Primary

Republican Primary

General Election

District 23 
3rd term incumbent Republican Representative Stan McClain has represented Florida House of Representatives 23rd District since November 2016.

District 24 
4th term incumbent Republican Representative Paul Renner has represented Florida House of Representatives 24th District since 2015.
Timothy Sharp is running for election.

District 25 
3rd term incumbent Republican Representative Tom Leek has represented Florida House of Representatives 25th District since November 2016.

District 26 
2nd term incumbent Republican Representative Elizabeth Fetterhoff has represented Florida House of Representatives 26th District since November 2018.

District 27 
1st term incumbent Republican Representative Webster Barnaby has represented Florida House of Representatives 27th District since November 2020.

District 28 
3rd term incumbent Republican Representative David Smith has represented Florida House of Representatives 28th District since November 2016.
Mark Caruso is running for election.

District 29 
4th term incumbent Republican Representative Scott Plakon has represented Florida House of Representatives 29th District since November 2014.

District 30 
2nd term incumbent Democratic Representative Joy Goff-Marcil has represented Florida House of Representatives 30th District since November 2018.

District 31 
1st term incumbent Republican Representative Keith Truenow has represented Florida House of Representatives 31st District since November 2020.

District 32

District 33

District 34 
3rd term incumbent Republican Representative Ralph Massullo has represented Florida House of Representatives 34th District since November 2016.

District 35 
4th term incumbent Republican Representative Blaise Ingoglia has represented Florida House of Representatives 35th District since November 2014.

District 36 
4th term incumbent Republican Representative Amber Mariano has represented Florida House of Representatives 36th District since November 2014.

District 37 
2nd term incumbent Republican Representative Ardian Zika has represented Florida House of Representatives 37th District since November 2018.

District 38 
2nd term incumbent Republican Representative Randy Maggard has represented Florida House of Representatives 38th District since 2019.

District 39 
3rd term incumbent Republican Representative Josie Tomkow has represented Florida House of Representatives 39th District since May 2018.

District 40 
4th term incumbent Republican Representative Colleen Burton has represented Florida House of Representatives 40th District since May 2014.
Jennifer Canady is running for election.

District 41 

Democratic Primary

General Election

District 42 
1st term incumbent Republican Representative Fred Hawkins has represented Florida House of Representatives 42nd District since November 2020.

District 43 
1st term incumbent Democratic Representative Kristen Arrington has represented Florida House of Representatives 43rd District since November 2020.

District 44 
Daisy Morales (incumbent) was defeated by Rita Harris.

Democratic Primary

District 45 
3rd term incumbent Democratic Representative Kamia Brown has represented Florida House of Representatives 45th District since November 2016.

District 46 
1st term incumbent Democratic Representative Travaris McCurdy has represented Florida House of Representatives 46th District since November 2020.

District 47 
2nd term incumbent Democratic Representative Anna Eskamani has represented Florida House of Representatives 47th District since November 2018. She is running for reelection.

District 48 
1st term incumbent Democratic Representative Daisy Morales has represented Florida House of Representatives 48th District since November 2020.

District 49 
3rd term incumbent Democratic Representative Carlos Guillermo Smith has represented Florida House of Representatives 49th District since November 2016.

District 50 
3rd term incumbent Republican Representative Rene Plasencia has represented Florida House of Representatives 50th District since November 2016.
Tom Keen is running for election.

District 51 
2nd term incumbent Republican Representative Tyler Sirois has represented Florida House of Representatives 51st District since November 2018.

District 52 
3rd term incumbent Republican Representative Thad Altman has represented Florida House of Representatives 52nd District since November 2016.

District 53 
3rd term incumbent Republican Representative Randy Fine has represented Florida House of Representatives 53rd District since November 2016.

District 54 
3rd term incumbent Republican Representative Erin Grall has represented Florida House of Representatives 54th District since November 2016.

District 55 
1st term incumbent Republican Representative Kaylee Tuck has represented Florida House of Representatives 55th District since November 2020.

District 56 
2nd term incumbent Republican Representative Melony Bell has represented Florida House of Representatives 56th District since November 2018.

District 57 
2nd term incumbent Republican Representative Mike Beltran has represented Florida House of Representatives 57th District since November 2018.

District 58 
3rd term incumbent Republican Representative Lawrence McClure has represented Florida House of Representatives 58th District since 2017.

District 59 
1st term incumbent Democratic Representative Andrew Learned has represented Florida House of Representatives 59th District since November 2020.

District 60 
3rd term incumbent Republican Representative Jackie Toledo has represented Florida House of Representatives 60th District since November 2016.

District 61 
2nd term incumbent Democratic Representative Dianne Hart has represented Florida House of Representatives 61st District since November 2018.

District 62

Democratic Primary

General Election

District 63 
2nd term incumbent Democratic Representative Fentrice Driskell has represented Florida House of Representatives 63rd District since November 2018.

District 64 
1st term incumbent Republican Representative Traci Koster has represented Florida House of Representatives 64th District since November 2020.

District 65 
1st term incumbent Republican Representative Traci Koster has represented Florida House of Representatives 65th District since November 2020.

District 66 
2nd term incumbent Republican Representative Nick DiCeglie has represented Florida House of Representatives 66th District since November 2018. He is retiring to running for Florida State Senate District 24.
Berny Jacques and Alen Tomczak are seeking the Republican nomination.

District 67

District 68 
3rd term incumbent Democratic Representative Ben Diamond has represented Florida House of Representatives 68th District since November 2016.

District 69

District 70 
1st term incumbent Democratic Representative Michele Rayner has represented Florida House of Representatives 70th District since November 2020.

District 71 
2nd term incumbent Republican Representative Will Robinson has represented Florida House of Representatives 71st District since November 2018.

District 72 
1st term incumbent Republican Representative Fiona McFarland has represented Florida House of Representatives 72nd District since November 2020.

District 73 
2nd term incumbent Republican Representative Tommy Gregory has represented Florida House of Representatives 73rd District since November 2018.

District 74 
2nd term incumbent Republican Representative James Buchanan has represented Florida House of Representatives 74th District since November 2018.

District 75 
1st term incumbent Republican Representative Michael J. Grant has represented Florida House of Representatives 75th District since November 2020.

District 76 
1st term incumbent Republican Representative Adam Botana has represented Florida House of Representatives 76th District since November 2020.

District 77 
1st term incumbent Republican Representative Mike Giallombardo has represented Florida House of Representatives 77th District since November 2020.

District 78 
1st term incumbent Republican Representative Jenna Persons has represented Florida House of Representatives 78th District since November 2020.

District 79 
2nd term incumbent Republican Representative Spencer Roach has represented Florida House of Representatives 79th District since November 2018.

District 80 
1st term incumbent Republican Representative Lauren Melo has represented Florida House of Representatives 80th District since November 2020.

District 81 
1st term incumbent Democratic Representative Kelly Skidmore has represented Florida House of Representatives 81st District since November 2020.

District 82 
1st term incumbent Republican Representative John Snyder has represented Florida House of Representatives 82nd District since November 2020.

District 83 
2nd term incumbent Republican Representative Toby Overdorf has represented Florida House of Representatives 83rd District since November 2018.

District 84 
1st term incumbent Republican Representative Dana Trabulsy has represented Florida House of Representatives 84th District since November 2020.

District 85 
3rd term incumbent Republican Representative Rick Roth has represented Florida House of Representatives 85th District since November 2016.

District 86 
3rd term incumbent Democratic Representative Matt Willhite has represented Florida House of Representatives 86th District since November 2016.
Seth Densen and Katherine Waldron are seeking the Democratic nomination.

District 87 
3rd term incumbent Democratic Representative David Silvers has represented Florida House of Representatives 87th District since November 2016.

District 88 
1st term incumbent Democratic Representative Omari Hardy has represented Florida House of Representatives 88th District since November 2020. He resigned to fun the U.S House of Representatives District  20th special election. 
Jervonte Edmonds and Sienna Osta are seeking the Democratic nomination.

District 89 
2nd term incumbent Republican Representative Mike Caruso has represented Florida House of Representatives 89th District since November 2018.
Lauren Levy is running as Democratic candidate in election.

District 90 
2nd term incumbent Democratic Representative Joseph Casello has represented Florida House of Representatives 90th District since November 2018.
Keith Feit is running as Republican candidate in election.

District 91 
2nd term incumbent Democratic Representative Emily Slosberg has represented Florida House of Representatives 91st District since November 2018.

District 92 
3rd term incumbent Democratic Representative Patricia Hawkins-Williams has represented Florida House of Representatives 92nd District since November 2016.

District 93 
2nd term incumbent Republican Representative Chip LaMarca has represented Florida House of Representatives 93rd District since November 2018.

District 94 
4th term incumbent Democratic Representative Bobby DuBose has represented Florida House of Representatives 94th District since November 2014.
Bobby DuBose succeeded by Daryl Campbell.
Elijah Manley is running as Democratic candidate in election.

District 95 
2nd term incumbent Democratic Representative Anika Omphroy has represented Florida House of Representatives 95th District since November 2018.

District 96 
1st term incumbent Democratic Representative Christine Hunschofsky has represented Florida House of Representatives 96th District since November 2020.

District 97 
2nd term incumbent Democratic Representative Dan Daley has represented Florida House of Representatives 97th District since 2019.
Daniel Foganholi is running as Republican candidate in election.

District 98 
2nd term incumbent Democratic Representative Christine Hunschofsky has represented Florida House of Representatives 98th District since November 2018.

District 99 
4th term incumbent Democratic Representative Anika Omphroy has represented Florida House of Representatives 99th District since November 2014.
Hillary Cassel and Jeremy Katzman are seeking the Democratic nomination.

District 100 
1st term incumbent Democratic Representative Marie Woodson has represented Florida House of Representatives 100th District since November 2020.
Todd Delmay, Jordan Leonard, Clay Miller and Gustavo Ortega are seeking the Democratic nomination.

District 101 
1st term incumbent Democratic Representative Marie Woodson has represented Florida House of Representatives 101st District since November 2020.

District 102 
1st term incumbent Democratic Representative Felicia Robinson has represented Florida House of Representatives 102nd District since November 2020.

District 103 
1st term incumbent Republican Representative Tom Fabricio has represented Florida House of Representatives 103rd District since November 2020.

District 104 
1st term incumbent Democratic Representative Robin Bartleman has represented Florida House of Representatives 104th District since November 2020.

District 105 
2nd term incumbent Republican Representative David Borrero has represented Florida House of Representatives 105th District since November 2018.

District 106 
3rd term incumbent Republican Representative Bob Rommel has represented Florida House of Representatives 106th District since November 2016.

District 107 
1st term incumbent Democratic Representative Christopher Benjamin has represented Florida House of Representatives 107th District since November 2020.

District 108 
2nd term incumbent Democratic Representative Dotie Joseph has represented Florida House of Representatives 108th District since November 2018.

District 109 
James Bush (incumbent) was defeated by Ashley Gantt in the Democratic primary election. Gantt ran unopposed in the general election.

Democratic Primary

District 110 
1st term incumbent Republican Representative Alex Rizo has represented Florida House of Representatives 110th District since November 2020.

District 111 
1st term incumbent Republican Representative Bryan Avila has represented Florida House of Representatives 111th District since November 2020.

District 112 
3rd term incumbent Democratic Representative Nicholas Duran has represented Florida House of Representatives 112th District since November 2016.

District 113 
2nd term incumbent Democratic Representative Michael Grieco has represented Florida House of Representatives 90th District since November 2018.
Keith Feit is running as Republican candidate in election.

District 114 
1st term incumbent Republican Representative Demi Busatta Cabrera has represented Florida House of Representatives 114th District since November 2020.

District 115 
1st term incumbent Republican Representative Vance Aloupis has represented Florida House of Representatives 115th District since November 2020.

District 116 
2nd term incumbent Republican Representative Daniel Perez has represented Florida House of Representatives 116th District since November 2018.

District 117 
1st term incumbent Democratic Representative Kevin Chambliss has represented Florida House of Representatives 117th District since November 2020.

District 118 
2nd term incumbent Republican Representative Anthony Rodriguez has represented Florida House of Representatives 118th District since November 2018.

District 119 
2nd term incumbent Republican Representative Juan Fernandez-Barquin has represented Florida House of Representatives 119th District since November 2018.

District 120 
1st term incumbent Republican Representative Jim Mooney has represented Florida House of Representatives 120th District since November 2020.

See also
 2022 Florida elections
 2022 Florida Senate election
 2022 United States House of Representatives elections in Florida

Notes

References

External links 

Florida House of Representatives elections
House of Representatives
Florida House